Taliani is a surname which may refer to:

 Adnan Al Taliani (1964), retired footballer from the United Arab Emirates
 Alessio Taliani (born 1990), Italian professional racing cyclist
 Emidio Taliani (1838–1907), Italian Cardinal of the Roman Catholic Church
 Francesco Maria Taliani de Marchio (1887–1968), Italian diplomat 
 Reda Taliani (born 1980), Algerian raï singer and musician

See also
 I-taliani, Italian television series
 Tagliani, disambiguation

Italian-language surnames